Thomas Noel Hill, 2nd Baron Berwick of Attingham, FSA (21 October 1770 – 3 November 1832), was a British peer and art patron.

The first son of Noel Hill, who was created Baron Berwick in 1784, and his wife Anna Vernon, he was educated at Jesus College, Cambridge, where he was in the same year as Edward Daniel Clarke, and graduated as M.A. in 1791. In 1792–94, he paid Clarke's expenses as a traveling companion to Germany, Switzerland and Italy; he employed Angelica Kauffman in painting. In 1801 Thomas Noel Hill became a Fellow, Society of Antiquaries (F.S.A.). On 8 February 1812 he married Sophia Dubochet, daughter of John James Dubochet, at St Marylebone Church, London. (Sophia and her famous sister Harriette Wilson were highly fashionable courtesans.) In 1827 and 1829 they were forced to hold bankruptcy auctions to pay off debts. At this point Thomas's younger brother William came to the rescue and purchased much of the furniture and then leased their home, Attingham Park. Thomas and Sophia escaped to Italy, where Thomas died childless at age 62 in Naples; upon his death his brother William Noel-Hill inherited the title.

Coat of arms

References

1770 births
1832 deaths
Alumni of Jesus College, Cambridge
Thomas